Clayton Michael Greenfield (born June 3, 1984) is an American professional stock car racing driver. He competes part-time in the NASCAR Craftsman Truck Series, driving the No. 84 Toyota Tundra for Cook Racing Technologies.

Racing career

A graduate of Clarksville Academy, early in his career Greenfield competed primarily in the UARA-Stars Series, also making several qualifying attempts in the ARCA Racing Series in the mid-2000s, his debut being at Salem Speedway in 2004; driving for Wayne Peterson Racing, he finished 12th to score the team's best race finish since 1998. Greenfield made his debut in NASCAR competition in 2010, driving for Team Gill Racing in the Camping World Truck Series at Martinsville Speedway. Over the next three years, he competed in 22 races, posting a best finish of 10th at Daytona International Speedway in 2012. Greenfield also made his debut in the Nationwide Series in 2011, finishing 35th at Atlanta Motor Speedway, driving the No. 71 for Rick Ware Racing.

Greenfield began the 2013 season by posting the fastest time in practice for the Truck Series' season-opening event at Daytona International Speedway in February, and finished 26th in the race, but then failed to qualify for the next two races. He finished 16th at Kansas Speedway, then returned to the series at Kentucky Speedway in July, finishing 35th for Norm Benning Racing. A few weeks later, he and Norm Benning were surprisingly racing against each other for a final transfer spot in the Mudsummer Classic race yet lost it to his part-time owner. Greenfield has not driven for Benning since.

In 2020, Greenfield returned to the Truck Series to run a part-time schedule, which was then the full season excluding Las Vegas, Daytona RC, and Phoenix, and also made his first ARCA start since 2015, where he drove Andy Hillenburg's No. 11 car at Pocono. Greenfield had a new crew chief for his Truck Series team starting that year, as he was able to get Fox NASCAR commentator and two-time Cup Series champion crew chief Jeff Hammond to come out of retirement and crew chief his No. 68 in the races it was entered in.

In 2021, Greenfield was due to running the full season with him running for 3 races due to sponsorship. Greenfield ultimately failed to qualify at Daytona, Nashville, and Gateway. He did qualify for Darlington for an impressive 19th-place finish. Like Murphy, Greenfield joined Spencer Davis Motorsports for the UNOH 200.

Motorsports career results

NASCAR
(key) (Bold – Pole position awarded by qualifying time. Italics – Pole position earned by points standings or practice time. * – Most laps led.)

Nationwide Series

Craftsman Truck Series

 Season still in progress
 Ineligible for series points

ARCA Menards Series
(key) (Bold – Pole position awarded by qualifying time. Italics – Pole position earned by points standings or practice time. * – Most laps led.)

References

External links
 
 

Living people
1984 births
People from Clarksville, Tennessee
Racing drivers from Tennessee
NASCAR drivers
ARCA Menards Series drivers